The Rape of Pevensey (also known as Pevensey Rape) is one of the rapes, the traditional sub-divisions unique to the historic county of Sussex in England.  With an area of  it is the largest of the Sussex rapes.

History
William the Conqueror granted the rape of Pevensey to his half-brother Robert, Count of Mortain shortly after the Norman Conquest.

Location
Pevensey rape lies between the rape of Lewes to the west and the rape of Hastings to the east. The north-west of the rape is bounded by the county of Surrey and the north-east of the rape by the county of Kent. To the south lies the English Channel. The rape of Pevensey includes the towns of Crowborough, Eastbourne and East Grinstead.

Sub-divisions
The rape is traditionally divided into the following hundreds:

 Alciston
 Bishopstone
 Burleigh Arches
 Danehill Horsted
 Dill
 East Grinstead
 Eastbourne
 Flexborough
 Hartfield
 Longbridge
 Loxfield Dorset
 Loxfield Pelham
 Pevensey Lowey
 Ringmer
 Rotherfield
 Rushmonden
 Shiplake
 Totnore
 Willingdon

See also
 History of Sussex
 List of hundreds of England and Wales

References

External links
 Pevensey Rape through time  - A Vision of Britain

History of Sussex